Estadio Rubén Marcos Peralta, formerly known as Parque Schott, is a football stadium in Osorno, Chile, home to club Provincial Osorno. It was built in 1940 and has a capacity of 10,000. It contains wood stands, and over eighty percent of the stands are roof-covered.

In August 2006, a major renovation took place, and the pitch cover was switched from natural to artificial grass. In November 2006 it was re-inaugurated under its current official name, which honors the former local football legend Rubén Marcos Peralta, who played in Universidad de Chile and Chil National Team in the 1960s.

Record attendance
11,357 set on August 26, 1995, (Primera Division 1995), Provincial Osorno vs. Universidad de Chile

Ruben Marcos Peralta
Sports venues in Los Lagos Region
Buildings and structures in Osorno, Chile